Albrecht VII, Count of Schwarzburg-Rudolstadt (16 January 1537 – 10 April 1605) was Count of Schwarzburg and founder of the Line of Schwarzburg-Rudolstadt, which later received the title of Prince.

Early life 
He was the youngest of the surviving sons of Günther XL, Count of Schwarzburg-Blankenburg and his wife Countess Elisabeth zu Ysenburg-Büdingen-Birstein (1508-1572).

Biography 
His father, Günther XL, had united all of the Schwarzburg possessions.  After he died in 1552, the county inherited by his four surviving sons, Günther XLI, John Günther I, William I and Albrecht VII, who divided their country in 1572. After the deaths of childless Günther XLI in 1583 and Wilhelm I in 1597, his possessions were divided between the still living brothers Johann Günther and Albrecht VII. This partition became the beginning of two lines of the house of Schwarzburg, Schwarzburg-Rudolstadt and Schwarzburg-Sondershausen, both of which existed until the post-World War I major governmental changes of 1918.

Albrecht, studied at several German universities and in Padua. From 1557 he resided at the court of the Prince of Orange-Nassau. He served from 1563 under his brother Günther XLI in the army of King of Denmark and from 1573 lived in Rudolstadt.

Family and children
He was married twice. Firstly, on 14 June 1575 he married Countess Juliana of Nassau-Dillenburg, daughter of Count William I of Nassau-Dillenburg and had the following children:
 Charles Günther, Count of Schwarzburg-Rudolstadt (6 November 1576 – 24 September 1630)
 Elisabeth Juliane (1 January 1578 – 28 March 1658)
 Sophie (1 March 1579 – 24 August 1630), married on 30 March 1595 to Count Jobst II of Barby-Mühlingen
 Magdalene (12 April 1580 – 22 April 1632), married on 22 May 1597 to Henry II, Count of Reuss-Gera
 Louis Günther I, Count of Schwarzburg-Rudolstadt (27 May 1581 – 4 November 1646)
 Albert Günther I, Count of Schwarzburg-Rudolstdat (8 August 1582 – 20 January 1634)
 Anna Sybille (14 March 1584 – 22 August 1623), married on 15 November 1612 to Count Christian Günther I of Schwarzburg-Sondershausen
 Katharina Maria (13 July 1585 – 19 January 1659)
 Katharina Susanna (13 February 1587 – 19 April 1662)
 Henry Günther, died young in 1589

Secondly, on 2 March 1591 he married Countess Albertine Elisabeth of Leiningen-Westerburg (1568–1617), daughter of Count Reinhard II von Leiningen-Westerburg (1530-1584) and his wife, Countess Ottilia von Manderscheid-Blankenheim-Keyll (1536-1597). The marriage was childless.

Sources 
 F. Apfelstedt: Das Haus Kevernburg-Schwarzburg von seinem Ursprunge bis auf unsere Zeit, Arnstadt 1890
 Dr. Kamill von Behr: Genealogie der in Europa regierenden Fürstenhäuser, Leipzig 1870

Schwarzburg-Rudolstadt, Albrecht VII of
Schwarzburg-Rudolstadt, Albrecht VII of
Counts of Schwarzburg
House of Schwarzburg
People from Schwarzburg-Rudolstadt
16th-century German people